Balsam Forebay is an artificial lake in the Sierra National Forest of Fresno County, California near California State Route 168 approximately  north east of Shaver Lake.  A trail provides public access to and around the forebay with access to from the southeast shore. Road access to limited to official vehicles. The area is popular for hiking, swimming, and a picnicking.

Balsam Meadow Dam
The lake is formed by the Balsam Meadow Dam, a rockfill dam completed in 1986. Southern California Edison owns the dam.

See also
 List of lakes in California
 List of dams and reservoirs in California

References

External links
 

Reservoirs in Fresno County, California
Sierra National Forest
Reservoirs in California
Reservoirs in Northern California